Kelon may refer to:

 Kēlōn or Shadoof, an irrigation tool
 Hisense Kelon or Kelon, a Chinese appliance manufacturer
 Kelon language, a Papuan language of Indonesia
 a class of composite material; see, for example, Percussion mallet
 the Breton name of Chelun, Brittany, France

See also
 Kelong, a type of offshore platform found in Southeast Asia